Alero's Symphony is a 2011 Nigerian musical drama film directed by Izu Ojukwu and starring Bimbo Manuel, Ivie Okujaye and Chibuzor 'Faze' Oji. It premiered at The Palms, Genesis Cinemas, Lagos. The film is an upshot of the Amstel Malta Box Office 5 (AMBO 5) reality show. It received 4 nominations at the 8th Africa Movie Academy Awards and was screened across major Nigerian cities by the Africa Film Academy.

The film tells the story of Alero (Okujaye), a twin born into a reputable high-class family. After graduating from university with honors, she is due to attend law school. Unbeknownst to her parents, her real desire is to be a singer. The family decides to go on an island vacation to re-ignite their familial bond. While there, Alero meets Lovechild (Faze), a talented but poor waiter. Lovechild helps Alero pursue what she loves as a career. They then fall in love.

Cast
Ivie Okujaye as Alero
Chibuzor Oji as Lovechild
Jibola Dabo
Bimbo Manuel
Victor Olaitan
Carol King
Frederick Leonard
Timi Richards

Reception
Nollywood Reinvented gave the film a 43% rating and praised the originality and story, however it criticized Faze's acting and concluded saying "It’s the first Izu Ojukwu movie that I do not absolutely adore. I was made to wait a really long time to finally see it but in retrospect I wish I used that time for more fruitful endeavours. It’s not absolutely terrible a movie, but it doesn’t live up to the standard of the filmmaker."

Accolades

References

External links
Alero's Symphony at the Internet Movie Database
Alero's Symphony on Nollywood Reinvented

2011 romantic drama films
2011 films
2010s musical drama films
Nigerian musical drama films
Nigerian romantic drama films
Films directed by Izu Ojukwu
2010s English-language films
English-language Nigerian films